In computing, an opcode (abbreviated from operation code, also known as instruction machine code, instruction code, instruction syllable, instruction parcel or opstring) is the portion of a machine language instruction that specifies the operation to be performed. Beside the opcode itself, most instructions also specify the data they will process, in the form of operands. In addition to opcodes used in the instruction set architectures of various CPUs, which are hardware devices, they can also be used in abstract computing machines as part of their byte code specifications.

Overview
Specifications and format of the opcodes are laid out in the instruction set architecture (ISA) of the processor in question, which may be a general CPU or a more specialized processing unit. Opcodes for a given instruction set can be described through the use of an opcode table detailing all possible opcodes. Apart from the opcode itself, an instruction normally also has one or more specifiers for operands (i.e. data) on which the operation should act, although some operations may have implicit operands, or none at all. There are instruction sets with nearly uniform fields for opcode and operand specifiers, as well as others (the x86 architecture for instance) with a more complicated, variable-length structure. Instruction sets can be extended through the use of opcode prefixes which add a subset of new instructions made up of existing opcodes following reserved byte sequences.

Operands
Depending on architecture, the operands may be register values, values in the stack, other memory values, I/O ports (which may also be memory mapped), etc., specified and accessed using more or less complex addressing modes. The types of operations include arithmetic, data copying, logical operations, and program control, as well as special instructions (such as CPUID and others).

Assembly language, or just assembly, is a low-level programming language, which uses mnemonic instructions and operands to represent machine code. This enhances the readability while still giving precise control over the machine instructions. Most programming is currently done using high-level programming languages, which are typically easier for humans to understand and write. These languages need to be compiled (translated into assembly language) by a system-specific compiler, or run through other compiled programs.

Software instruction sets
Opcodes can also be found in so-called byte codes and other representations intended for a software interpreter rather than a hardware device. These software-based instruction sets often employ slightly higher-level data types and operations than most hardware counterparts, but are nevertheless constructed along similar lines. Examples include the byte code found in Java class files which are then interpreted by the Java Virtual Machine (JVM), the byte code used in GNU Emacs for compiled Lisp code, .NET Common Intermediate Language (CIL), and many others.

See also

 Gadget (machine instruction sequence)
 Illegal opcode
 Syllable (computing)

References

Further reading 
 

Machine code